The 1986–87 season was Port Vale's 75th season of football in the English Football League, and first (16th overall) season back in the Third Division following promotion from the Fourth Division. John Rudge led to Vale to a mid-table finish, his Player of the Year signing Andy Jones scoring 37 goals in all competitions. Vale Park saw its record lowest attendance for a competitive encounter when only 994 loyal supporters turned out for an Associate Members' Cup clash with Hereford United. More than ten times this number turned out to see the Vale beaten by Manchester United in the Second Round of the League Cup. Rudge also signed Ray Walker to the club, and Andy Porter made his debut.

Overview

Third Division
The pre-season saw John Rudge bring 28-year-old stopper Mark Grew to the club from Ipswich Town. He also bought Aston Villa's Ray Walker for £12,000; Sheffield United winger Paul Smith for £10,000; and Walsall's 'cultured' striker Richard O'Kelly for £6,000. Rudge was connected with the vacant management position at Preston North End, but declared himself happy at Vale Park. The season would see its midweek games played on a Tuesday, rather than the traditional Monday, and the play-offs were also introduced.

The season opened with a 2–2 draw at crisis club Middlesbrough, who were forced to play the fixture at Hartlepool, after finding themselves kicked out of Ayresome Park. Vale also drew their opening home match the following week against Rotherham United, and Grew was forced off with a knee injury and Alan Webb split his shinbone. Jim Arnold agreed to return to the club on non-contract terms to replace the injured Grew. Playing a 'fluent, passing game', Vale defeated bogey-team Walsall, who had maintained a 21-game unbeaten league run against the "Valiants" since 1965. Ageing Arnold failed to maintain his fitness and Vale struggled around the foot of the table. Rudge signed 'giant' Alex Williams on loan from Manchester City. Despite Andy Jones leading the scoring charts, Vale still suffered, and Rudge's attempts to sign Steve Bull from West Bromwich Albion failed. On 9 November, Vale Park hosted an American football match, in which Locomotive Derby beat the Stoke Spitfires 13–8. By the end of the month Vale were cut four points adrift at the bottom of the league. The next month John Williams was sold to Bournemouth for £30,000, having been in poor form for Vale. Rudge then splashed out £5,000 on Bristol City's Gary Hamson. He also brought Bob Hazell in from Reading on a free transfer.

Hazell successfully shored up the Vale defence, as in his first three games the Vale kept three clean sheets. In January, O'Kelly required a knee operation, but good news came as Alex Williams was signed permanently for £10,000. On 27 January, Robbie Earle made his 142nd consecutive appearance in a 1–1 draw with Rotherham United at Millmoor, picking up a groin injury that put him into the treatment room. The next week a 4–2 win over Doncaster Rovers was the last of a streak of six games unbeaten, that took the Vale up to fourteenth in the table. Rudge attempted to sign Don Goodman, who was transfer listed at Bradford City, but ended his interest after being quoted £100,000. A bad February ended with a 6–1 capitulation at home to Blackpool, Vale's biggest home defeat since March of the disastrous 1956–57 season. Vale picked up eleven of a possible eighteen points in March, with Rudge also signing Darren Beckford on loan from Manchester City. On 28 March, the club recorded their biggest ever away win by thumping Fulham 6–0 at Craven Cottage, with Jones bagging a hat-trick. On 1 April, Jones was selected for the Wales squad, and scored past Finland. Vale lost five of their seven April games, but ensured their safety by ripping apart Newport County on 4 May, with Jones hitting five goals.

They finished in twelfth spot with 57 points, twelve points clear of Bolton Wanderers. Andy Jones scored 37 goals in all competitions.

Finances
On the financial side, a loss was made of £53,373. Match receipts earned £228,422, whilst the market rents raised £100,614. The bank overdraft stood at £216,453, whilst the club's total debts were £363,878. The club's shirt sponsors were Browns Transport. Both Geoff Hunter and Wayne Ebanks left on free transfers, Hunter joining Wrexham. Chairman Jim Lloyd also resigned due to his deteriorated relationship with the board. He was replaced by garage owner Bill Bell, who was one of many men to have worked on building Vale Park in the 1940s. Bell stated that he was not afraid to cut loose any deadwood.

Cup competitions
In the FA Cup, the First Round tie with non-league neighbours Stafford Rangers attracted a healthy crowd of 5,738 (the second highest attendance of the season), and Vale advanced with a 1–0 win. Travelling to Walsall for the Second Round, they were on the end of a 5–0 drubbing at the Bescot Stadium. Jim Lloyd called the 'tame surrender' a 'disgrace' and Rudge ordered extra training for the players.

In the League Cup, Vale advanced past Notts County 7–1 on aggregate following wins both at home and at Meadow Lane. They then faced Ron Atkinson's First Division Manchester United at the Second Round, just as they had in 1983. United picked up a 3–0 victory at Old Trafford before eliminating the Vale with a 5–2 win in Stoke-on-Trent.

In the Associate Members' Cup, the opening match against Fourth Division Hereford United set a club-record for the lowest-ever attendance for a competitive first team game, as only 994 fans turned up at Vale Park on 22 December to witness Vale win through a Jones goal. The missing fans only missed 'a long yawn in freezing conditions'. A 2–1 defeat to Newport County at Somerton Park failed to prevent Vale advancing to the First Round. Vale then eliminated Exeter City with a 1–0 win at St James Park. However Gillingham defeated Vale 4–3 on penalties after a 3–3 draw in Burslem.

League table

Results
Port Vale's score comes first

Football League Third Division

Results by matchday

Matches

FA Cup

League Cup

Associate Members' Cup

Player statistics

Appearances

Top scorers

Transfers

Transfers in

Transfers out

Loans in

Loans out

References
Specific

General

Port Vale F.C. seasons
Port Vale